Mattai may refer to:

 Mar Mattai Monastery, the traditional see of the Orthodox maphrian in Bartella
 Mar Matti or Matthew the Hermit
 Nittai of Arbela or Mattai of Arbela, av beit din of the Sanhedrin under the nasi Joshua ben Perachyah at the time of John Hyrcanus (reigned 134–104 BCE)

See also
 Matai (disambiguation)